"Forever & Always" is a song written and recorded by American singer-songwriter Taylor Swift for her second studio album, Fearless (2008). It was a last-minute addition to the album. Produced by Swift and Nathan Chapman, "Forever & Always" is a country pop and pop rock song with lyrics about a troubled relationship with an ex-boyfriend, inspired by singer Joe Jonas, whom Swift briefly dated in 2008.

Music critics considered the song catchy but generic, and commented that it sets the precedent to Swift's later songs about past romance. After Fearless was released, "Forever & Always" peaked at number 34 on the U.S. Billboard Hot 100 and 32 on the Canadian Hot 100. It was certified platinum by the Recording Industry Association of America (RIAA).

A re-recorded version of "Forever & Always", subtitled "Taylor's Version", features on Fearless (Taylor's Version), Swift's 2021 re-recorded version of Fearless, released on April 9, 2021. "Forever & Always (Taylor's Version)" charted on singles charts in Australia, Canada, Singapore, and the U.S.

Background and release

Taylor Swift released her second studio album, Fearless, on November 11, 2008, through Big Machine Records. The album's songs are largely about the challenges and emotions posed by love from a teenager's perspective. Swift wrote or co-wrote all the 13 album tracks, including seven solely by herself. "Forever & Always" was the last song Swift wrote for Fearless; Swift pleaded with Big Machine president Scott Borchetta to include it on the album a day before the track list finalized, believing the track contained the story she wanted to tell. The track is produced by Swift and Nathan Chapman. An alternate version, "Forever & Always (Piano Version)", was included on the track list for Fearless: Platinum Edition, released on October 26, 2009.

During promotion of Fearless, Swift repeatedly confirmed that "Forever & Always" was inspired by her breakup with singer Joe Jonas; on The Ellen DeGeneres Show, she described him as "the boy who broke up with me over the phone in 25 seconds when I was 18". She told MTV News that she "owed it" to her fans to be open about her personal life. In an interview with Rolling Stone, Swift described the fallout of that relationship as a "really dramatic and crazy" experience that she "[needed] to address" through her music. Speaking about the recording, she said, "This song starts with this pretty melody that's easy to sing along with, then in the end... I'm basically screaming it because I'm so mad."

Jonas addressed the song in a 2009 issue of Seventeen magazine, "It's flattering. It's always nice to hear their side of the story." In May 2019, Swift apologized for "[putting] Joe Jonas on blast" on the Ellen show, calling it "some teenage stuff". After a dispute with Big Machine in 2019, when she had signed a new contract with Republic Records, Swift released her re-recorded version of Fearless, subtitled Taylor's Version, on April 9, 2021. Fearless (Taylor's Version) includes re-recorded versions of both "Forever & Always" and "Forever & Always (Piano Version)", both subtitled "Taylor's Version". The re-recorded versions are produced by Swift and Christopher Rowe.

Composition and critical reception
"Forever & Always" is about a troubled relationship with an immature boyfriend who still "hasn't called" but, at an earlier point in their relationship, had declared that they would be together "forever and always". In the album's liner notes, Swift includes the song's hidden message: "If you play these games, we’re both going to lose." Similar to other songs on Fearless, "Forever & Always" depicts Swift's perception of romantic relationships as a teenage girl, who calls out her ex-boyfriend for being a "scared little boy". Compared to the overall starry-eyed fairy tale-inspired theme of Fearless, the lyrics of "Forever & Always" focus more on real-life heartbreak.

It is a country pop and pop rock song that features instruments associated with country music such as fiddles and guitars. "Forever & Always" is written in the key of B flat major with a tempo of 120 beats per minute. The piano version is in A major instead. James E. Perone, an academic in music, complimented the song's radio-friendly production, but felt that it was "too generic and market-oriented" for a singer-songwriter. Writing for Billboard, Jennifer Keishin Armstrong felt that Swift's songwriting on "Forever & Always" set a precedent to her subsequent songs about revenge and contempt for ex-lovers. Nate Jones of Vulture and Hazel Cills of Pitchfork agreed, finding the Joe Jonas-inspired "Forever & Always" introduced Swift's trademark songwriting about failed romance and celebrity; Cillz wrote: "[Swift] likes to give a play-by-play, stacking minute summaries of a moment on top of each other like she’s story-boarding the perfect montage out of an indelible memory." In another review for Pitchfork in 2021, Dani Blum selected "Forever & Always" as the best song on Fearless, highlighting the tumultuous emotions in Swift's vocals.

Live performances

Swift first performed "Forever & Always" during her concert for the 2009 Dick Clark's New Year's Rockin' Eve, as part of a medley with "Picture to Burn", "Love Story", and "Change", on December 31, 2008. In a January 2009 episode of Saturday Night Live, Swift performed "Forever & Always" and "Love Story". She sang the song again as part of her performances for the Florida Strawberry Festival in February and the 2009 Country Music Association Awards in November 2009.

The song was part of the regular set list for shows of Swift's first headlining concert tour, the Fearless Tour (2009–2010). Before performing "Forever & Always", Swift gave a mock interview with Today host Hoda Kotb; Kotb asked why men should date Swift if she was going to write songs to call them out, to which Swift replied that they "shouldn't do bad things". After the mock interview, Swift appeared onstage in a red dress, and while performing the song, threw an armchair down the stairs onstage.

Swift performed "Forever & Always" during some select dates of her following world tours. She included it on the set list for her March 22, 2013, show in Columbia, South Carolina, as part of the Red Tour. She performed the song during her September 15, 2018, show in Indianapolis, Indiana, as part of her Reputation Stadium Tour.

Commercial performance
After Fearless (2008) was released, "Forever & Always" peaked within the top 40 of the US Billboard Hot 100 (number 34, three weeks total) and the Canadian Hot 100 (number 37, two weeks total). In July 2018, the Recording Industry Association of America (RIAA) certified the song platinum for surpassing one million units based on sales and streaming. Following the release of the re-recorded Fearless (Taylor's Version) (2021), "Forever & Always (Taylor's Version)" charted in official singles charts of Australia, Canada, Singapore, and the U.S. It also peaked at number 41 on the Billboard Global 200 chart.

Charts

"Forever & Always"

"Forever & Always (Taylor's Version)"

Certifications

References

Sources

2008 songs
Song recordings produced by Taylor Swift
Song recordings produced by Nathan Chapman (record producer)
Song recordings produced by Chris Rowe
Songs written by Taylor Swift
Taylor Swift songs
American pop rock songs